Błażej Podleśny (born 13 September 1995) is a Polish volleyball player, playing in position setter.

Sporting achievements

Clubs 
Polish Championship U-21:
  2014
Czech Championship:
  2019
Austrian Cup:
  2021
Austrian Championship:
  2021
Middle European Volleyball Zonal Association (MEVZA):
  2022

Individual
 2021: MVP Austrian Cup

References

External links
 MlodaLiga profile
 Volleybox profile
 Volley.SportFin profile
 CVF-Web.DataProject profile
 CEV profile
 CEV profile

1995 births
Living people
Polish men's volleyball players
Jastrzębski Węgiel players